The Veracruz Cathedral, dedicated to Our Lady of the Assumption, is located in the historic center of the city of Veracruz, Mexico. It was consecrated as a cathedral in 1963.

Previously, there had been a parish church of modest proportions on the site, built in the early 17th century and completed in 1731.
It had a single tower on the right-hand side.

The building

It is in the form of a basilica and has a wide nave flanked by two aisles on either side. The octagonal dome has a small lantern and a covering of Puebla tiles. The three-staged tower also has a small dome.

The main entrance is constructed in a simple neoclassical style with two doors and a pediment. The first section has a half-pointed entrance arch guarded by even columns on the sides and two columns at the corners, both of Doric design, forming two grooves which support a cornice and the upper section. The choir window, surmounted by a medallion, stands in the centre of the second section. The same series of columns as in the lower section is repeated but now of Ionic design. A central triangular pediment is topped by a medallion.

The simple interior contains Baccarat crystal chandeliers and the high altar, donated by the Austria-Hungarian Empire.

External links 

Official Information Veracruz Cathedral and the Diocese of Veracruz
Official information from the Diocese of Veracruz
Official information from the Social Pastoral of the Diocese of Veracruz

Veracruz (city)
Buildings and structures in Veracruz
Roman Catholic cathedrals in Mexico
Roman Catholic churches completed in 1731
1731 in New Spain
Spanish Colonial architecture in Mexico
Church buildings with domes
18th-century Roman Catholic church buildings in Mexico